Chiu Chui-cheng is a Taiwanese politician. He currently serves as the Deputy Minister of the Mainland Affairs Council.

Education
Chiu obtained his master's degree in national development from National Taiwan University and doctoral degree in political science from National Taiwan Normal University.

Early careers
Prior to his appointment as Deputy Minister, Chiu was a professor of the Department of International and Mainland China Affairs of National Quemoy University.

See also
 Cross-Strait relations

References

Government ministers of Taiwan
Living people
Year of birth missing (living people)